Daniel L. Ritchie (born 1932) is the Chancellor Emeritus of the University of Denver, a former CEO of major communication corporations, and a Harvard alumnus. He hails from China Grove, North Carolina and has moved around the country from coast to coast before eventually settling in Denver, Colorado.

Early life and education
Ritchie attended Harvard University where he earned a bachelor's degree and a Masters in Business Administration from Harvard Business School. After earning his degrees from Harvard, he briefly served in the Army and then as a securities analyst in New York.

Career

Early career
Ritchie came to Colorado to run Columbia Savings and Loan in the 1960s. After working with Columbia Savings and Loan, Ritchie moved to Hollywood, where he served as executive vice president of MCA Inc. He lived in the house that actor Michael Wilding built for Elizabeth Taylor and earned a large salary, but, according to Ritchie, Hollywood left him queasy, so he left what he termed the "grubby" and "heartless" business of Hollywood.

Westinghouse
After his years in Hollywood, Ritchie entered the organic foods industry as an entrepreneur and then spent eight years as CEO of Westinghouse Broadcasting. Ritchie was reportedly especially proud that Westinghouse broke the AIDS story nationally while he was at its helm. As Ritchie recalled in a 2005 article honoring his legacy, an affiliate station in San Francisco came to him with solid reporting about a new plague that was terrifying the medical community. The story was so startling—and its ramifications so serious—that Ritchie said he knew it merited national attention. Ritchie and his team decided to cancel the corporation's prime-time lineup in favor of a report chronicling the virus. "It cost us money not to have prime-time programming," he explained, noting that no company wanted its products promoted during such an alarming program. Nonetheless, he said, he and his team made the decision to put public need ahead of the bottom line—a consideration, he said, that he doubted would be respected by today's broadcasting leadership. "It used to be that we were expected to make good money, but we were also expected to be responsive to public need," he noted.

This philosophy of putting the greater good as the top priority was carried into his work later on at the University of Denver and through community organizations and boards. After holding helm of the multinational corporation of Westinghouse for many years, he retired at age 55 to the Grand River Ranch near Kremmling, Colorado, where he planned to spend years, if not the rest of his life, raising cattle and enjoying his ranch. The move to Colorado capped a career of nearly 30 years spent in executive positions with MCA, Inc. and Westinghouse.

University of Denver
Ritchie was invited to become involved in the University of Denver during a time when that University was suffering from the financial downturn that had engulfed the Denver area in the 1980s. In a retrospective that interviewed Ritchie about his contributions to the University, Ritchie recalled borrowing money to make payroll, noting that the success of the university was by no means secured. Yet with its rich history of contributing to the state's economic and cultural life, Ritchie noted, DU struck him as well worth rejuvenating. He served as vice chairman of the board and chaired the development committee before becoming Chancellor.

Chancellor

Daniel L. Ritchie was named the 16th chancellor of the University of Denver, the oldest private university in the Rocky Mountain region,
, following Dwight Morrell Smith (January 1984-July 1989). He was nicknamed the first "cowboy chancellor" because of his philosophy of cowboy ethics and his background in ranching before living on campus. During his tenure, the University pioneered in the teaching of ethics at both the graduate and undergraduate levels. Chancellor Ritchie collaborated with Bill Daniels to incorporate ethics, values and social responsibility in the business school curriculum. Shortly after his inauguration as the Chancellor, Ritchie appointed a task force to undertake a thorough review of international activities at the University. Based on that report, under Ritchie's direction the University began a transformation of the University's international programs. In the University's then-new strategic plan, Study Abroad and International Human Rights Advocacy figured prominently. The Cherrington Global Scholars initiative, which continues to provide opportunities for every junior at the University to be able to study abroad at no cost beyond that of tuition, is a continuing tribute to his leadership. Similarly, the International Human Rights Advocacy Center in the University's Office of Internationalization owes its existence to his vision. He served as the Chancellor without pay and has donated to the University most of his spacious Grand River Ranch, which over time has netted more than $50 million for various University projects. As he said of the gift in 1998, "The ranch has held a very special place in my heart for the last two decades. I love this land, but I love the University of Denver more."

Under Chancellor Ritchie's leadership, the University concluded the largest fundraising campaign in its history in 2001, topping the $200 million goal by nearly $74 million. The campus' skyline and culture changed with a multimillion-dollar construction and renovation program begun under Ritchie's leadership. In 2005, also under Ritchie's leadership, DU opened the new Center for Travel & Tourism, which serves as an academic research center.

Ritchie was also instrumental in developing DU as both a meeting and cultural destination. He played a role in securing the Frozen Four tournament for Denver in 2008, which was one of the city's major sporting events. He served as the Chancellor for 15 years from 1989 to 2005.

In 2000, the University completed the Daniel L. Ritchie Center, which houses the 17 Division 1 University of Denver varsity sports programs as well as the Coors Fitness Center.
Among its amenities, the Ritchie Center offers:
 A  work out area
 A squash court and two racquetball courts
 Seven personal training studios
 Six outdoor lighted tennis courts
 A two-story climbing wall
 An Olympic-size pool

Chairman of the Board: University of Denver
After serving as the Chancellor of the University for 15 years, Ritchie stepped down, but not away. He continued to stay involved in the University by becoming chairman of the Board of Trustees from 2007 to 2009.

Denver Center for the Performing Arts
Ritchie had always been interested in the performing arts as demonstrated through his commitment toward supporting the building of the state of the art music and theater building on the University of Denver's campus, the Newman Center for the Performing Arts. He increased his involvement with one of the nation's largest cultural complexes, the Denver Center for Performing Arts in January 2007, becoming Chairman and CEO of the Denver Center. He succeeded Donald R. Seawell, who founded The Denver Center in 1972.

Boards and Organizations
In addition to serving as The Denver Center's Chairman, Ritchie currently serves as President of the Temple Hoyne Buell Foundation which focuses on early childhood education and development. He serves on the Boards of the Daniels Fund, which supports programs that encourage personal responsibility and achievement by funding college scholarships and community programs, and the Denver Art Museum Foundation, on the Executive Committee of Colorado Concern, and is Chairman Emeritus and Honorary Member of the Board of the Central City Opera House Association. He is President of the Independent Higher Education of Colorado Fund. Ritchie has also served as chair of the Education Committee of the National Park System Advisory Board. In 2010, Gov. Bill Ritter congratulated Daniel L. Ritchie on his appointment as the new chairman of Colorado Concern, one of the state's top business organizations, and thanked departing chair Walter Isenberg for his leadership.

Awards
The Citizen of the West Award, given by the National Western Stock Show to an individual who exemplifies the spirit and determination of the Western pioneer (1998)
the National Samaritan Institute Award
the Gold Medal Award of the Poor Richard Club
Outstanding Philanthropist at National Philanthropy Day
the National Human Relations Award from the American Jewish Committee
the Community Cultural Enrichment Award from the Mizel Museum of Judaica
and the Ethical Leadership Award from the University of Denver
He is a Laureate member of the Colorado Business Hall of Fame
Honorary Professor at Bundelkhand University, Jhansi, India.(2000) (5) Tourism Hall of Fame Inductee (2005)
the Ethical Leadership Award from the University of Denver

See also
University of Denver
Robert Coombe
Colorado
Denver Boone
Daniels College of Business
Sturm College of Law
Josef Korbel School of International Studies
Denver Center for the Performing Arts
Magness Arena

Notes

References

 University of Denver Magazine Winter 2005. "Dan Ritchie Unscripted" Tamara Chapman. November 1, 2005. https://magazine-archive.du.edu/current-issue/dan-ritchie-unscripted/
 University of Denver Magazine Winter 2006. "Ritchie Center Amenities are a Magnet for Students" Doug McPherson. December 6, 2006. 
 https://web.archive.org/web/20100119180339/http://www.danielsfund.org/About/Board%20Bios/Daniel_Ritchie.asp
 https://web.archive.org/web/20150518092104/http://www.denvercenter.org/BioProfiles/DanielLRitchie.aspx.aim.com/
 Chancellor Daniel L. Ritchie.(University of Denver) Denver Journal of International Law and Policy. December 22, 2001. http://findarticles.com/p/articles/mi_hb3262/is_1_30/ai_n28890485/
 https://web.archive.org/web/20110728120108/http://tourismhalloffame.org/hall-of-fame/inductees/bio.aspx?hofer=30
 http://www.du.edu/builtforlearning/profiles/daniel-ritchie.html
 "DU chancellor shares wealth School gift worth $15 million" Paul Hutchinson. Denver Post. June 9, 1994
 "DU REAPING BENEFITS OF 10-YEAR PLAN UNIVERSITY IN FOREFRONT OF ETHICS, TECHNOLOGICAL LEARNING, SAYS CHANCELLOR." Published on October 24, 1999. Rocky Mountain News. Bill Scanlon.
 "DU CHANCELLOR BACKS TEAMS AND TECHNOLOGY CONVOCATION AUDIENCE TOLD THAT UNIVERSITIES MUST ADAPT TO TIMES." Published on October 8, 1998. Rocky Mountain News. Bill Scanlon.
 "CHANCELLOR TO GIVE 18,000 ACRES TO DU." Published on April 16, 1998. Carla Crowder . Rocky Mountain News.
https://web.archive.org/web/20100312170759/http://www.colorado.gov/cs/Satellite/GovRitter/GOVR/1251566551060
 http://www.harvard.edu
 http://www.daniels.du.edu/aboutus/history/index.html

American entertainment industry businesspeople
Living people
Harvard Business School alumni
Chancellors of the University of Denver
1932 births